Marko Kostić (born 10 October 1995) is a Serbian football goalkeeper who plays for Canadian Soccer League club Serbian White Eagles FC.

Club career

Radnički Kragujevac  
Kostić played at the youth level with Radnički Kragujevac. In 2014, he joined the senior team in the Serbian SuperLiga. He made his professional debut on May 16, 2015, against FK Jagodina. The following season Radnički was relegated to the Serbian First League where Kostić remained with the team. The club experienced another season where they were relegated to the third tier. Throughout the season, he appeared in 23 matches. 

Following his departure from Radnički he played in the country's third division with RSK Rabrovo in 2020. In 2020, he returned to the second tier to play with Sloga Kraljevo as an emergency goalkeeper. He made his debut for Sloga on May 1, 2021, against FK Dubočica.

Canada  
In the summer of 2022, he played abroad in the Canadian Soccer League with the Serbian White Eagles. He helped the Serbs in securing the regular-season title including a playoff berth. He played in the second round of the postseason against FC Continentals where the White Eagles were eliminated.

References

External links
 
 

1995 births
Living people
Sportspeople from Mitrovica, Kosovo
Kosovo Serbs
Association football goalkeepers
Serbian footballers
FK Radnički 1923 players
FK Trepča players
FK Sloga Kraljevo players
Serbian White Eagles FC players
Serbian First League players
Serbian SuperLiga players
Serbian League players
Canadian Soccer League (1998–present) players